Jessica Hancco (born 10 September 1995) is a Peruvian race walker. She competed in the women's 20 kilometres walk event at the 2016 Summer Olympics.

References

External links
 

1995 births
Living people
Peruvian female racewalkers
Place of birth missing (living people)
Athletes (track and field) at the 2016 Summer Olympics
Olympic athletes of Peru
21st-century Peruvian women